The South Common Centre Bus Terminal is located in western Mississauga, Ontario, Canada. It is situated on the western side of South Common Centre.

The terminal does not contain a building, partly due to having direct connection to the mall and to the nearby buildings such as South Common Library. Instead, it is formatted as a transit mall, with benches and bus shelters on either side of the terminal.

Tickets and passes for both transit systems are available inside the South Common Centre. MiWay tickets and passes are also sold at South Common Community Centre, which is also located beside the terminal.

The terminal, along with Erin Mills Town Centre, could possibly be relocated to the Erin Mills BRT Station of the Mississauga Transitway, for more connectivity with other routes that are planned to serve the station.

Bus routes

Bus service within the terminal itself is by MiWay and Oakville Transit.

MiWay
All routes are wheelchair-accessible.

Oakville Transit

References

MiWay
Bus stations in Ontario